Tung Chee-hwa  (born 7 July 1937) is a Hong Kong businessman and politician who served as the first Chief Executive of Hong Kong between 1997 and 2005, upon the transfer of sovereignty on 1 July. He served as a vice chairman of the Chinese People's Political Consultative Conference (CPPCC) between 2005 and 2023.

Born as the eldest son of Chinese shipping magnate Tung Chao Yung, who founded Orient Overseas Container Line (OOCL), Tung took over the family business after his father's death in 1981. Four years later, OOCL teetered on the edge of bankruptcy, and the business was saved by the People's Republic of China government through Henry Fok in 1986.

He was appointed an unofficial member of the Executive Council of Hong Kong by the last British Governor Chris Patten in 1992 and was tipped as Beijing's favourite as the first Chief Executive of the Hong Kong SAR. In 1996, he was elected the Chief Executive by a 400-member Selection Committee. His government was embroiled with a series of crises, including the bird flu and the 1997 Asian Financial Crisis. In 2002, he was re-elected without competition. In 2003, more than 500,000 protesters demanded Tung to step down in the light of the proposed legislation of the Hong Kong Basic Law Article 23 and the SARS outbreak. Tung resigned in the middle of his second term on 10 March 2005.

After his resignation, he was appointed vice chairman of the Chinese People's Political Consultative Conference by the Beijing government and formed the China-United States Exchange Foundation (CUSEF) in 2008 to influence public opinion towards China in the United States. In 2014, he founded a think tank Our Hong Kong Foundation consisting of the membership of numerous leading tycoons. He remains influential in Hong Kong politics and is dubbed as "kingmaker".

Family and early life
Tung was born in Shanghai on 7 July 1937, 29th day of the fifth lunar month in 1937 in the Chinese calendar into an influential shipping magnate family of Tung Chao Yung, who is of Zhoushan, Ningbo descent. Tung Chao Yung was the founder of the Orient Overseas Container Line, a shipping company which was closely associated with the government of the Republic of China. His younger brother, Tung Chee-chen, was ranked as the 23rd wealthiest man in Hong Kong in 2009, worth US$900 million. In January 2008, Tung and his family were ranked (also by Forbes) as the 16th wealthiest in Hong Kong, with a total value of US$3 billion.

In 1949 during the Chinese Communist Revolution, when Tung was 12 years old, Tung's father moved the family to Hong Kong. His father remained close to Chiang Kai-shek's Kuomintang government on Taiwan, in which the logo OCCL has been plum blossom, the national flower of the Republic of China. In the 1950s, Tung attended the Chung Wah Middle School, a leftist school later shut down by the Hong Kong colonial government in the light of the 1967 Hong Kong riots. He was sent abroad to study at Liverpool University, leaving him with a lifelong passion for the Liverpool Football Club. He graduated from the university with a Bachelor of Science degree in marine engineering in 1960. From Liverpool he was sent to the United States to work as an engineer at General Electric in Massachusetts, and then for the family business in New York. He also lived in San Francisco before he returned to Hong Kong in 1969.

All of Tung's children hold American citizenship.

Early business and political career

He joined his father's business upon his return to Hong Kong in 1969 and gradually took over the leadership of the family enterprise. He took over his family business in 1982 when his father died. However, in 1985, his company was heavily in debt and teetered on the edge of bankruptcy. Henry Fok, a pro-Beijing businessman took initiative and helped Tung's family, with the support of the Beijing government. At the time of the Sino-British negotiation over Hong Kong's sovereignty, Beijing was enforcing the "united front" strategy to gather the widest possible range of allies together and gradually isolate opponents. 

Tung became close to the Communist authorities in Beijing afterward especially with Jiang Zemin, former General Secretary of the Chinese Communist Party, who had risen to power surrounded by his "Shanghai clique"; Tung could be associated with them because he was from the nearby city of Ningbo, Zhejiang and had lived and worked in Shanghai for a while. 

Tung was a member of the Basic Law Consultative Committee from 1985 to 1990, responsible for the drafting of the Basic Law of Hong Kong. In 1993, he was appointed to the Chinese People's Political Consultative Conference, the top advisory body of China. He also established close relationship with US President George H. W. Bush and US Assistant Secretary of State Winston Lord.

Under the consensus between the British and Chinese government, Tung, until then remained a low profile in politics, was appointed to the Executive Council of Hong Kong by the last British Governor Chris Patten, the highest advisory body in the colonial government in 1992, before he left the office in 1996 and ran for the first Chief Executive election. 

Before the election, he received a warm handshake from Jiang Zemin who crossed a crowded room to single out Tung, which was seen as a sign of him being regarded as Beijing's choice for the Chief Executive. Tung employed three "isms" in his election campaign, namely Confucianism, elitism and nationalism. On 11 December 1996, he was elected by a 400-member Selection Committee, receiving 320 votes and beating former judge Yang Ti-liang and tycoon Peter Woo, all three candidates were of Shanghainese descent. He was sworn in as the first Chief Executive of Hong Kong Special Administrative Region on the day of transfer of sovereignty on 1 July 1997.

Chief Executive

First term

In early 1997, Tung saw his victory in the first Chief Executive election, in the voting conducted by 400 committees of electoral college whose members are appointed by the Chinese Government.

The government pledged to focus on three policy areas: housing, the elderly, and education. Measures on housing included a pledge to provide 85,000 housing flats each year so as to resolve the problems of soaring property prices. The Asian financial crisis that hit Hong Kong in months after Tung took office made this objective almost immediately redundant and, in fact, it was a collapse in property prices that became a far more pressing problem in the years between 1998 and 2002.

After being appointed by the State Council of China, Tung took office on 1 July 1997. His first term was significantly – and negatively – impacted by the Asian financial crisis and there was criticism by the general public of his style of governance.   Job losses and plummeting values in the stock and property markets, combined with controversial economic policies (which were called crony capitalism at the time), the people of Hong Kong started to question Tung and the HKSAR government.

During Tung's first term the government proposed a number of controversial infrastructure and reformation projects including technology park, a science park, a Chinese medicine centre and the Disney theme park. Tung's decisions were somewhat questioned by the central government, including Jiang Zemin, former General Secretary of the Chinese Communist Party.

Questions arose over Tung's decision to grant the Cyberport Project to Richard Li, son of tycoon Li Ka-shing, without the benefit of an open tender.

The way in which the Walt Disney Company's land grant for its theme park on a 50-year lease apparently disrupted the market, and for studying the possibility of setting up a casino in Hong Kong. His administration was seen as troubled, particularly during the confusion of the first days of the new airport, the mis-handling of the avian influenza epidemic, declining standards due to education reforms (specifically teaching in the Cantonese "mother tongue" and mandatory English examination for teachers), the right of abode issue, and his disagreement of political views with the popular then Chief Secretary, Anson Chan. Tung's popularity plummeted with the economy, to 47% satisfaction at the end of August 2002.

Second term 

Tung Chee Hwa, with nominations from 714 members of the electoral college, was uncontested in the election for a second term, as according to the Chief Executive Election Ordinance, nominations from at least 100 members of the 800-strong electoral college are required for each candidate.

Accountability system 

In an attempt to resolve the difficulties in governance, Tung reformed the structure of government substantially starting from his second term in 2002. In a system popularly called the Principal Officials Accountability system, all principal officials, including the Chief Secretary, Financial Secretary, Secretary for Justice and head of government bureaux would no longer be politically neutral career civil servants. Instead, they would all be political appointees chosen by the Chief Executive. The system was portrayed as the key to solve previous administrative problems, notably the cooperation of high-ranking civil servants with the Chief Executive. Under the new system, all heads of bureau became members of the Executive Council, and came directly under the Chief Executive instead of the Chief Secretary or the Financial Secretary. The heads of the Liberal Party and Democratic Alliance for the Betterment of Hong Kong, two pro-government parties in the Legislative Council, were also appointed into the Executive Council to form a "ruling alliance," a de facto coalition. This practically shut out the pro-democratic parties and individuals.

Crisis of governance in 2003 
The first major move of Tung in his second term was to push for the national security legislation to implement Article 23 of the Hong Kong Basic Law in September 2002. However, the initiative drew a hostile response from the pro-democratic camp, lawyers, journalists, religious leaders and human rights organisations. This stoked public concerns that the freedoms they enjoyed would deteriorate. The sentiment, together with other factors such as the SARS epidemic in early 2003, when the government was criticised for its slow response, strained hospital services and the unexpected death toll, resulted in the largest mass demonstration since the establishment of HKSAR, with an estimated 500,000 people (out of the population of 6,800,000) marching on 1 July 2003. Many demanded Tung to step down.

In response to the protests, the leader of the Liberal Party, James Tien, resigned from the Executive Council on evening 6 July, signifying the withdrawal of the party's support for the bill implementing Article 23. As a result, the government had to postpone and later withdraw the bill from the legislative agenda. On 17 July 2003, Regina Ip, the then Secretary for Security who was responsible for implementing Article 23, resigned for personal reasons. Another Principal Official, Finance Secretary Antony Leung, who earlier suffered from a scandal over his purchase of a luxury vehicle weeks prior to his introduction of a car sales tax, which was dubbed as the Lexusgate scandal, resigned on the same day.

Subsequent developments 

During the debate over Hong Kong's constitutional development, Tung was criticised as not reflecting effectively the views of the general population to push for 2007/08 universal suffrage to the People's Republic of China government. Although the primary target of popular opposition was the PRC government, Tung's lack of support for the pro-democratic camp resulted in his low approval ratings.

In late 2003, in an attempt to bring back visitors to Hong Kong, Government agency InvestHK was mandated to sponsor the Harbour Fest music festival in October, organised by the American Chamber of Commerce. The result was a series of poorly attended concerts, HK$100m bill for the taxpayers, with the Government, InvestHK and the American Chamber of Commerce blaming each other for the flop., EOC chairman to be added.

Tung's cabinet suffered another blow in July 2004 when another Principal Official, the Secretary for Health, Welfare & Food, Dr. Yeoh Eng-kiong, resigned on 7 July to take political responsibility for the government's handling of the SARS outbreak in 2003, after the release of the investigation report of LegCo over the issue.

In late 2004, the Tung administration experienced another embarrassment as the large planned sale of government-owned real estate, The Link REIT, was cancelled at the last moment by a lawsuit by a tenant from an affected estate.

With the subsequent improvement in the economy over 2004, unemployment fell and the long period of deflation ended. This resulted in a decrease in public discontent as the government's popularity improved, and popular support for the democratic movement dwindled with a protest in January attracting a mere few thousand protesters compared to the 1 July protests of 2003 and 2004. However, the popularity of Tung himself remained low compared to his deputies including Donald Tsang and Henry Tang.

Resignation
Tung's reputation suffered further damage when Hu Jintao gave him a humiliating public dressing-down for poor governance in December 2004. Official sources specifically cited the poor handling of the Link REIT listing, the West Kowloon cultural project, the Hung Hom flats episode. Tung himself denied it was a dressing-down, and insisted that he retained the central government's support, although he and the rest of the government were asked to examine their past inadequacies. Hu's words, however, were thinly veiled criticism. Nevertheless, in his January 2005 Policy Address, Tung gave a rather critical verdict on his own performance.

The speculation which was running rife in the weeks in the run-up to his actual resignation, and its intensity, continued to perpetuate the impression of Tung's "weakness" and "confusion". Prior to Tung's resignation, in mid-February Stanley Ho, a tycoon with close ties with Beijing, had already commented on the possible candidates for the next Chief Executive and personally endorsed Donald Tsang. This started rumours that Tung would be nominated to the election of vice chairman of Chinese People's Political Consultative Conference (CPPCC) of the PRC. On the night of 27 February 2005, it was revealed that he and nine other persons would be appointed as new members to the CPPCC. All the local newspapers, except for the three controlled by the PRC government, namely Ta Kung Pao, Wen Wei Po and Hong Kong Commercial Daily, went to the presses preemptively on the morning of 2 March with the headline "Tung Resigns". Tung declined to comment when questioned by journalists waiting at the government headquarters.

On 10 March 2005, Tung assembled a press conference at the Central Government Offices and announced that he had tendered his resignation due to "health problems". After flying to Beijing on 11 March, Tung was elected Vice Chairman of the Chinese People's Political Consultative Conference (CPPCC) on 12 March 2005, the last day of CPPCC annual meeting.

His resignation sparked a constitutional debate of whether his successor should fill his remaining term of two years, or start a new term of five years. Tung was mostly chosen by the PRC due to his business background as well as owing Beijing for saving him from bankruptcy with a US$100 million loan.

Post-Chief Executive

U.S.−China politics
Soon after he resigned as Chief Executive, he was appointed vice-chairman of the Chinese People's Political Consultative Conference (CPPCC) in March 2005. In 2008, Tung formed the China-United States Exchange Foundation (CUSEF), a group whose stated aim is to promote better understanding between the two countries. In 2009, he was named a Global Fellow at Columbia University. In 2017, it was reported that the CUSEF has been a tool for the Chinese Communist Party to push to strengthen its influence over policy debate around the globe by massive funding into organisations abroad, for instance the China Studies department of the Johns Hopkins University's School of Advanced International Studies (SAIS).

In 2018, the University of Texas at Austin rejected funding from the CUSEF for its recently established China Public Policy Center, after U.S. Senator Ted Cruz wrote a letter to UT Austin president Greg Fenves in which Cruz expressed his concerns that the university's China Public Policy Center was considering a partnership with the foundation "given its affiliation with the People's Republic of China's United Front system and its registration as an agent of a foreign principal." Cruz also noted Tung's CPPCC vice chairmanship is "an organization which works closely with the United Front, the structure the CCP utilizes to manage foreign influence operations."

Influence in Hong Kong
During the 2012 Chief Executive election, it was reported that one of the two candidates, Leung Chun-ying was Tung's protege and therefore Leung acquired the goodwill of Xi Jinping, then the head of managing the Hong Kong and Macau affairs. Leung, who was seen as the underdog, eventually won in the election over the other pro-Beijing candidate Henry Tang.

In 2014, Tung founded a thinktank Our Hong Kong Foundation. The foundation has about 80 advisors which consists some of the most well known tycoons and public figures, drawn from the business, education, social welfare, legal and religious sectors, including former Financial Secretary Antony Leung, former Monetary Authority Chief Executive Joseph Yam, and Jack Ma, the chairman of Chinese e-commerce giant Alibaba. The foundation has been vocal in advocating public policies, including the housing and land supply. In 2018, its proposal of massive reclamation by constructing artificial islands were partly adopted in Chief Executive Carrie Lam's policy address.

In the 2017 Chief Executive election, he was seen hugging Carrie Lam, then Chief Secretary for Administration who was seen as potential candidate for the Chief Executive after incumbent Leung Chun-ying announced he would not seek for re-election. It was seen as his blessing for Lam to be the next Chief Executive. In February, Hong Kong Economic Journal cited unnamed sources that Tung Chee-hwa said in a closed-door meeting that Beijing may not appoint former Financial Secretary of Hong Kong John Tsang as Chief Executive even if he wins the election. He said this was the reason he asked Carrie Lam to run in the election in order to prevent an "embarrassing situation". 30 electors of the Legal subsector in the Election Committee expressed "deep concerns" about Tung's comments in a joint statement, stating that "such action undermines the fairness of our Chief Executive election and shows a callous disregard for the aspirations of most Hong Kong people to have free and fair elections without ignorant and insensitive interference." He was dubbed as "kingmaker" in the Hong Kong political community.

In July 2017, Tung sold his family business Orient Overseas (International) Limited (OOIL) to Chinese state-owned Cosco Shipping in a HK$49.2 billion (US$6.3 billion) deal.

Awards
Tung was awarded a Grand Bauhinia Medal in 2006. He was also awarded an Honorary Doctorate degree in Social Sciences (D.S.Sc) by the Hong Kong University of Science and Technology on 10 November 2006.

See also
 Politics of Hong Kong
 Executive Council of Hong Kong

References

External links 
 Corpus of Political Speeches : Free access to political speeches by Tung Chee Hwa and other Chinese politicians, developed by Hong Kong Baptist University Library

|-

|-

|-

1937 births
Living people
Alumni of the University of Liverpool
Hong Kong billionaires
Hong Kong Buddhists
Vice Chairpersons of the National Committee of the Chinese People's Political Consultative Conference
Members of the 13th Chinese People's Political Consultative Conference
Members of the National Committee of the Chinese People's Political Consultative Conference
Hong Kong shipping businesspeople
Chief Executives of Hong Kong
Recipients of the Grand Bauhinia Medal
Businesspeople from Shanghai
People's Republic of China politicians from Shanghai
Members of the Preparatory Committee for the Hong Kong Special Administrative Region
Members of the Executive Council of Hong Kong
Hong Kong Basic Law Consultative Committee members
Hong Kong Affairs Advisors
Columbia University fellows
20th-century Chinese politicians
21st-century Chinese politicians
20th-century Hong Kong people
21st-century Hong Kong people
General Electric people
Chinese emigrants to Hong Kong
Chinese emigrants to British Hong Kong
People named in the Pandora Papers